Husabeol or Later Sabeol was a state during the Later Three Kingdoms of Korea, even though it is not included among the three. It was officially founded by the Silla prince Park Eonchang (朴彦昌 / 박언창; son of Gyeongmyeong of Silla) in 919, and fell to Gyeon Hwon's Hubaekje army in 927. Its capital was at Sangju, in present-day North Gyeongsang province.

Background

Fall

See also 

 History of Korea

Notes

References 

927 disestablishments
Former countries in East Asia
Former countries in Korean history
History of Korea
States and territories established in the 910s
Former monarchies of East Asia
919 establishments